Omari Shaquille Douglas (born 24 March 1994) is an English actor. He is known for his role as Roscoe Babatunde in the Channel 4 drama It's a Sin (2021). He has received nominations for a British Academy Television Award and a Laurence Olivier Award.

Early life
Douglas was born and brought up an only child in Wolverhampton, West Midlands by his mother whilst his father lived in the United States. He is of Jamaican heritage. He took classes with the Wolverhampton Youth Music Theatre. After completing school at Thomas Telford School, he moved to London in 2012 to attend drama school and graduated from the Arts Educational Schools in 2015.

Career
Douglas began his career in theatre. His credits include Cole Porter's High Society and, more recently, Emma Rice's adaptation of Wise Children at the Old Vic; Peter Pan and Jesus Christ Superstar at Regent's Park Open Air Theatre; Kneehigh's Tristan & Yseult at Shakespeare's Globe; The Life at the Southwark Playhouse; and Annie Get Your Gun at the Sheffield Crucible.

In October 2019, it was announced Douglas would star in Russell T Davies' miniseries It's a Sin as Roscoe Babatunde. The series premiered in January 2021 on Channel 4 and in February on HBO Max. Douglas is set to make his feature film debut in the biographical film Midas Man.

Douglas starred in Constellations at the Vaudeville Theatre in 2021, alongside Russell Tovey, in a version of the play revised to accommodate two male actors. In 2022, he received an Olivier Award nomination for Best Actor for his performance. He was cast as Cliff in the West End revival of Cabaret later in 2021.

Stage and screen credits

Film

Television

Theatre

Awards and nominations

Notes

References

External links

Living people
1994 births
21st-century English male actors
Black British male actors
British male musical theatre actors
British male television actors
English people of Jamaican descent
English gay actors
LGBT Black British people